Afroeurydemus bimaculatus is a species of leaf beetle of Ivory Coast, Gabon, the Republic of the Congo and the Democratic Republic of the Congo. It was first described by Édouard Lefèvre in 1877.

References 

Eumolpinae
Beetles of Africa
Insects of West Africa
Insects of Gabon
Insects of the Republic of the Congo
Beetles of the Democratic Republic of the Congo
Beetles described in 1877
Taxa named by Édouard Lefèvre